Club Balonmano Alzira was a Spanish handball team based in Alzira, Spain. CB Alzira achieved two great trophies before it was dissolved in 1995.

The club was founded in 1989 when a club located in Valencia city, Caixa Valencia was relocated to Alzira and renamed as Avidesa Alzira. The club was dissolved in July 1995, due to huge committed debts with its players.

Trophies
Copa del Rey: 1
Winners: 1991–92
EHF Cup: 1
Winners: 1993–94

Notable players
 Geir Sveinsson
 Vasile Stîngă
 Maricel Voinea
  Andrei Xepkin
 Jaume Fort
 Dragan Škrbić

References

External links
Avidesa Alzira wins Copa del Rey
CB Alzira wins EHF Cup

Spanish handball clubs
Handball clubs established in 1989
Sports clubs disestablished in 1995
Defunct handball clubs
1989 establishments in Spain
1995 disestablishments in Spain
Sports teams in the Valencian Community